The Aliens Restriction (Amendment) Act 1919 (9 & 10 Geo 5 c 92) is an Act of the Parliament of the United Kingdom originally aimed at continuing and extending the provisions of the Aliens Restriction Act 1914, and the British Nationality and Status of Aliens Act 1914 and to deal with former enemy aliens after the end of the First World War.

It provided the authority to produce the 1920 Aliens Order.

After subsequent amendment and repeal, what remains comprises section 3 on sedition and promoting industrial unrest, section 6 on the civil service, section 8 on juries, section 13 on offences and penalties, and section 16 giving the short title.

Section 1 - Continuance of emergency powers
This section was repealed by section 34(1) of, and Schedule 6 to, the Immigration Act 1971.

Section 2 - Extension of powers
Section 2(1) was repealed by section 34(1) of, and Schedule 6 to, the Immigration Act 1971.

Section 2(2) was repealed by Part V of the Schedule to the Statute Law (Repeals) Act 1971.

Section 3 - Incitement to sedition, etc
If any alien attempts or does any act calculated or likely to cause sedition or disaffection amongst any of His Majesty's Forces or the forces of His Majesty's allies, or amongst the civilian population, he shall be liable on conviction on indictment to penal servitude for a term not exceeding ten years, or on summary conviction to imprisonment for a term not exceeding three months.
If any alien promotes or attempts to promote industrial unrest in any industry in which he has not been bona fide engaged for at least two years immediately preceding in the United Kingdom, he shall be liable on summary conviction to imprisonment for a term not exceeding three months.

In 1977, the Law Commission recommended that this section be repealed.

The words "a fine not exceeding level 3 on the standard scale" are prospectively substituted for the words "imprisonment for a term not exceeding three months" in section 3(2) by paragraph 153 of Schedule 32 to the Criminal Justice Act 2003.

Section 4 - Pilotage certificates
This section was repealed by section 52(2) of, and Part II of Schedule 7 to, the Merchant Shipping Act 1979.

Section 5 - Employment of aliens in ships of the mercantile marine
This section was repealed by section 101(4) of, and Schedule 5 to, the Merchant Shipping Act 1970.

Section 7 - Restriction of change of name by aliens
Section 7 was repealed by Part V of the Schedule to the Statute Law (Repeals) Act 1971.

Section 9 - Deportation of former enemy aliens
This section was repealed by the Statute Law Revision Act 1927.

Section 10 - Admission of former enemy aliens
This section was repealed by the Statute Law Revision Act 1927.

Section 11 - Temporary restriction on acquisition by former enemy aliens of certain kinds of property
This section was repealed by the Statute Law Revision Act 1927.

Section 12 - Employment of former enemy aliens in British ships
This section was repealed by Schedule 2 to the Former Enemy Aliens (Disabilities Removal) Act 1925.

Section 13 - Offences and penalties
Section 13(3) was repealed by section 34(1) of, and Schedule 6 to, the Immigration Act 1971.

Section 14 - Saving for diplomatic persons, etc
Section 14(1) was repealed by section 34(1) of, and Schedule 6 to, the Immigration Act 1971.

Section 14(2) was repealed by Part V of the Schedule to the Statute Law (Repeals) Act 1971.

Section 15 - Definitions
This section was repealed by Part V of the Schedule to the Statute Law (Repeals) Act 1971.

Section 16 - Short title and repeal
Section 16(2) was repealed by Part V of the Schedule to the Statute Law (Repeals) Act 1971.

See also
 Halsbury's Statutes

References

External links
The Aliens Restriction (Amendment) Act 1919, as amended from the National Archives.
The Aliens Restriction (Amendment) Act 1919, as originally enacted from the National Archives.

United Kingdom Acts of Parliament 1919
Immigration law in the United Kingdom
History of immigration to the United Kingdom
Immigration legislation